Florin Gheorghe Nohai (born 13 April 1981) is a Romanian former footballer who played as a right back for teams such as Ceahlăul Piatra Neamț, Gaz Metan Mediaș or ACS Poli Timișoara, among others.

References

External links
 
 
 Florin Nohai at frf-ajf.ro

1981 births
Living people
Sportspeople from Piatra Neamț
Romanian footballers
Association football defenders
Liga I players
Liga II players
CSM Ceahlăul Piatra Neamț players
CS Gaz Metan Mediaș players
ACS Poli Timișoara players
FC Ripensia Timișoara players
CSC Dumbrăvița players